Karl Joseph Wilhelm Braun [sometimes referred to as Braun-Wiesbaden to differentiate him from other Karl Brauns] (20 March 1822 – 14 July 1893) was a German liberal politician and writer.

Biography
He was born at Hadamar, in the Duchy of Nassau, and studied classical philology and history at Marburg, and law and political economy at Göttingen. He was president of the Nassau Chamber of Deputies from 1859 to 1866, and as the leader of the Liberals advocated German unity and industrial freedom.

He was one of the founders of the Volkswirtschaftlicher Kongress (“Congress of German Economists”), and was elected its permanent president in 1859. In 1863 he established the Vierteljahrschrift für Volkswirtschaft und Kulturgeschichte (“Quarterly for Political Economy and History”) ,  the representative organ of the Free-Trade Party of Germany .  He edited this publication until 1887. As a deputy in the Reichstag, he was successively identified with the National Liberal, Secessionist, and German Liberal parties.

He published a great variety of works, among which Bilder aus der deutschen Kleinstaaterei (“Vignettes from the times of the small German principalities,” 1881) is the most notable.

Notes

References
 

1822 births
1893 deaths
People from Hadamar
People from the Duchy of Nassau
German Protestants
National Liberal Party (Germany) politicians
Liberal Union (Germany) politicians
German Free-minded Party politicians
Members of the 1st Reichstag of the German Empire
Members of the 2nd Reichstag of the German Empire
Members of the 3rd Reichstag of the German Empire
Members of the 4th Reichstag of the German Empire
Members of the 5th Reichstag of the German Empire
Members of the 6th Reichstag of the German Empire